Tsing Chuen Wai is a walled village located in the Lam Tei area, in the northern part of Tuen Mun District, in Hong Kong.

Administration
Tsing Chuen Wai is a recognized village under the New Territories Small House Policy. It is one of the 36 villages represented within the Tuen Mun Rural Committee. For electoral purposes, Tsing Chuen Wai is part of the Tuen Mun Rural constituency, which is currently represented by Kenneth Cheung Kam-hung.

History
Several villages of the Lam Tei area were established by the To Clan. Originally from Poyang, Jiangxi (other sources mention Watlam in Guangxi), the To Clan moved to Ngau Tam Mei and then to Tuen Mun Tai Tsuen. Following the increase of the clan population, the village dispersed and developed into five villages in the Lam Tei area: Nai Wai, Tsing Chuen Wai, Tuen Tsz Wai, Lam Tei Tsuen and Tuen Mun San Tsuen, which were all fortified.

Tsing Chuen Wai, formerly known as Mak Yuen Wai, was established by the To Clan about 300 years ago. Its present name came from the fact that the village was surrounded by its protective walls made of green bricks. The Tos had conflicts with the Tang Clan of Ping Shan during the Qing Dynasty, and attacks were carried out against the walled village. Watchmen at the watchtowers were killed but Tsing Chuen Wai was never captured by the Tangs. The enclosing walls and watchtowers were torn down in the 1960s.

Tsing Chuen Wai appears on the "Map of the San-On District", published in 1866 by Simeone Volonteri.

Features
The only surviving portion of the original green-brick boundary wall at the main entrance of the Wai gives visitors an insight into the walled village's historical outlook. Tin Hau, Kwan Tai and a Qing official are worshipped in the village shrine.

Transportation
Take LRT route No. 610, 614 or 615 and alight at Lam Tei stop, or KMB route No. 53, 63X, 68A, or minibus running between Jordan and Yuen Long.

See also
 Walled villages of Hong Kong
 Tuen Tsz Wai, another walled village established by the To Clan, located next to Tsing Chuen Wai

References

External links

 Delineation of area of existing village Tsing Chuen Wai (Tuen Mun) for election of resident representative (2019 to 2022)
 Antiquities and Monuments Office. Hong Kong Traditional Chinese Architectural Information System. Tsing Chuen Wai
 Film Services Office: Tsing Chuen Wai
 Webpage about Tsing Chuen Wai
 Antiquities Advisory Board. Pictures of the remains of the Watchtower at Tsing Chuen Wai

Lam Tei
Walled villages of Hong Kong
Villages in Tuen Mun District, Hong Kong